Pongolapoort Dam, commonly referred to as Jozini Dam creating Lake Jozini, is an arch type dam (double-curvature single-arch) in northern KwaZulu-Natal, South Africa located on the Phongolo River. The dam is situated  just north of the settlement of Jozini, 280 km north-east of the port city of Durban. The dam was constructed in 1973 at the eastern end of the narrow gorge separating the Lebombo and Ubombo ranges. The dam mainly serves for irrigation purposes and its hazard potential has been ranked high (3). The Phongolo River is the dam's largest feeder and outlet as well as the dam's only perennial feeder.

History

Prior to the construction of the Pongolapoort Dam, the land was Africa's first formally recognised conservation area. The Pongola Game Reserve was proclaimed in 1894 by the then President of the Transvaal Republic Paul Kruger. This would ultimately lead to the proclamation of the Hluhluwe-Imfolozi, Mkuze and Ndumo Game Reserves as well as one of Africa's greatest wildlife conservation parks, the Kruger National Park.

Wildlife

The dam is flanked by private wildlife reserves as well as the Pongola Game Reserve which has many private lodges as well campsite for fishing. Wildlife and birdlife abound in the area. Mammals to be sought include elephant, leopard, white and black rhinoceros, buffalo, hippopotamus, waterbuck, bushbuck, nyala, greater kudu, zebra, giraffe and spotted hyaena.

The dam and its surrounds support over 350 bird species which includes rarities such as African broadbill, saddle-billed and yellow-billed storks, African finfoot, Pel's fishing owl and Narina trogon. The dam also supports a breeding colony of pink-backed and great white pelicans. Additionally the dam supports a stable population of Nile crocodiles.

The dam is also home to the southernmost population of tigerfish. Other fish species include catfish and kurper.

Water quality

No information regarding the water quality of the dam but can be assumed to be fair. The Pongola Rivers major form of pollution is agricultural pesticides which make their way into the river due to the heavy use of land for agriculture above the dam.

Houseboat fire

Ballito based company Shayamanzi Houseboats is running a luxury houseboat operation on Lake Jozini. On 9 October 2021 one of the boats, Shayamanzi I, caught fire and completely burnt after a faulty engine overheated. The four crew members and five German tourists dived into the rough water, where three people (two crew member and one tourist) died. The cause of the fire and possible negligence is under investigation by South African Maritime Safety Authority (SAMSA).

See also
List of reservoirs and dams in South Africa

References 

 List of South African Dams from the Department of Water Affairs

Dams in South Africa
Dams completed in 1973